The 2016 Yale Bulldogs football team represented Yale University in the 2016 NCAA Division I FCS football season.  This season marked the Bulldogs's 144th overall season and the team played its home games at Yale Bowl in New Haven, Connecticut. They were led by fifth-year head coach Tony Reno. They were a member of the Ivy League. They finished the season 3–7 overall and 3–4 in Ivy League play to tie for fourth place. Yale averaged 8,795 fans per game.

Schedule

Roster

References

Yale
Yale Bulldogs football seasons
Yale Bulldogs football